Sheik Mohammed (born 9 April 1964) is a Guyanese cricketer. He played in 19 first-class and 14 List A matches for Guyana from 1987 to 1999.

See also
 List of Guyanese representative cricketers

References

External links
 

1964 births
Living people
Guyanese cricketers
Guyana cricketers